USS Tennessee (SSBN-734) is a United States Navy  ballistic missile submarine that has been in commission since 1988. She is the fourth ship and first submarine of the U.S. Navy to be named for Tennessee, the 16th state.

Construction and commissioning
Tennessee construction was authorized in fiscal year 1980, and the contract to build her was awarded to the Electric Boat Division of General Dynamics Corporation in Groton, Connecticut, on 7 January 1982. Her keel was laid down there on 9 June 1986. She was launched on 13 December 1986, sponsored by Mrs. Landess Kelso, and commissioned on 17 December 1988, with Captain Dennis Witzenburg in command of the Blue Crew and Captain Kenneth D. Barker in command of the Gold Crew.

The Tennessee was the first Ohio-class submarine commissioned capable of launching the Trident II ballistic missile (D5). On 21 March 1989, off the coast of Cape Canaveral, Florida, the Tennessee attempted the first submerged launch of the D5 which failed four seconds into the flight. Once the problem was understood, relatively simple changes were made and the first successful submerged test launch of a D5 missile was completed on 2 August 1989 by the Tennessee Blue Crew.

In popular culture
In Tom Clancy's 1994 novel Debt of Honor, Tennessee is one of several submarines sent to deal with a Japanese invasion of the Northern Mariana Islands. She is used as a "slow-attack" submarine, relying on her stealthiness and her torpedo tubes in combating Japanese forces. Tennessee is also used as a refueling point for a group of attack helicopters.

Notes

References

External links

USS Tennessee at GlobalSecurity.org

Ohio-class submarines
Cold War submarines of the United States
Nuclear submarines of the United States Navy
Ships built in Groton, Connecticut
1986 ships
Submarines of the United States